Support the Girls is a 2018 American comedy film written and directed by Andrew Bujalski. It stars Regina Hall, Haley Lu Richardson, James LeGros, Shayna McHayle, Dylan Gelula, AJ Michalka, Brooklyn Decker, Jana Kramer, John Elvis, Lea DeLaria, and Victor Isaac Perez.

The film had its world premiere at South by Southwest on March 9, 2018, and was theatrically released on August 24, 2018, by Magnolia Pictures. It received positive reviews from critics, with Hall's performance earning particular praise. Hall earned nominations at the Independent Spirit Awards and Gotham Independent Film Awards and won the New York Film Critics Circle Award for Best Actress, the first African-American to win the award.

Plot 
Lisa is the general manager of the sports bar and breastaurant Double Whammies. She takes her job seriously, protecting her employees from inappropriate or rude interactions with customers. Despite her commitment to the restaurant, her incompetent boss, Ben Cubby, has repeatedly threatened to fire her. His ire is provoked when Lisa has her employees host an off-the-books car wash to raise money for an employee, Shaina, who has hit her abusive boyfriend with her car and is staying at Lisa's house.

Despite Lisa's optimism, the day proves challenging: she has potential new employees to try out; an attempted robbery results in a man becoming stuck in a ventilation duct; one of her most trusted employees, Maci, turns out to be secretly dating a much older patron; another, Danyelle, is a single mother struggling with child care for her son; another gets a large tattoo of Steph Curry on her midsection despite tattoos being forbidden on employees; the bar is trying to get its cable fixed in time for a big fight that night; business is threatened by ManCave, another breastaurant developing in the area; and Lisa is separating from her depressed husband, Cameron. After Cubby scares Lisa during an episode of road rage, she calls Cameron for a ride.

Cubby fires Lisa and she forces herself to leave. When she returns home she learns from Shaina that Cameron has moved out. Shaina reveals that she is back together with her boyfriend and will use the fundraising money to pay his hospital bills. Furious, Lisa forces her to return the money. That night during the big fight, Maci and Danyelle, frustrated by the loss of Lisa, sabotage the cable in protest, leading to an awkward and tense scene with the customers and an off duty police officer.  Danyelle and Maci are fired soon after.

The next day, Lisa, Maci, and Danyelle interview with ManCave. The interviewer tells Lisa that ManCave waitresses are unintelligent and easily replaced. Lisa, Maci and Danyelle sit on the rooftop drinking liquor stolen from Double Whammies and contemplate their future employment before letting out cathartic screams.

Cast

Production 
In May 2017, it was announced Haley Lu Richardson, James LeGros, Regina Hall, AJ Michalka, Dylan Gelula, Junglepussy, Lea DeLaria, Jana Kramer, and Brooklyn Decker had joined the cast of the film, with Andrew Bujalski directing from a screenplay he wrote. Sam Slater and Houston King served as producers on the film, under their Burn Later Productions and Houston King Productions banners, respectively.

Filming 
Principal photography began in May 2017 in Texas.

Release 
The film had its world premiere at South by Southwest on March 9, 2018. Shortly after, Magnolia Pictures acquired U.S. distribution rights to the film. The film was theatrically released on August 24, 2018.

Reception 
The website's critical consensus reads, "Support the Girls handles serious themes—and a talented ensemble cast—with wit and humor, all while proving Regina Hall's talents have been woefully underutilized." On Metacritic the film has a weighted average score of 85 out of 100, based on 30 critics, indicating "universal acclaim".

David Fear wrote in Rolling Stone, "You could not ask for a better image of our country right now. You could not ask for a better American film to showcase it." Former President Barack Obama named the film one of his favorites of 2018.

Accolades

References

External links 
 
 

2018 films
2018 comedy films
2010s English-language films
2010s feminist films
American feminist comedy films
Films set in the 21st century
Films shot in Austin, Texas
Films set in Texas
Films set in restaurants
Films about the working class
2010s American films
2010s female buddy films
2018 independent films
American independent films